Hüseyin Kandemir (born 9 September 1986 in Adana, Turkey) is a Turkish rower. He is a member of Galatasaray Rowing in Istanbul.

He was the member of the bronze-winning team in the lightweight men's eight (LM8+) event at the 2014 World Rowing Championships in Amsterdam, Netherlands.

Kandemir earned a quota spot for 2016 Summer Olympics with his performance at the 2016 FISA European And Final Olympic Qualification Regatta in Lucerne, Switzerland. He will compete in the men's lightweight double sculls event along with his teammate Enes Kuşku.

References

1986 births
Sportspeople from Adana
Turkish male rowers
Galatasaray Rowing rowers
Living people
Rowers at the 2016 Summer Olympics
Olympic rowers of Turkey

World Rowing Championships medalists for Turkey
Mediterranean Games silver medalists for Turkey
Mediterranean Games medalists in rowing
Competitors at the 2013 Mediterranean Games